American Folk Songs for Children is a studio album released by Pete Seeger in 1953 by Folkways Records. It was Seeger's first solo album.

Track listing
"Bought Me a Cat"
"The Blue Tailed Fly (Jimmie Crack Corn)"
"Train is A-Coming"
"This Old Man"
"Froggie Went A-Courting"
"Jim Along Josie"  
"There Was a Man and He Was Mad"
"Clap Your Hands"
"She'll Be Coming Around the Mountain"
"All Around the Kitchen"
"Billy Barlow"

Background
Seeger selected the eleven songs for the album from an anthology of folk songs for children that had been published by his stepmother, Ruth Crawford Seeger, in her 1948 book titled American Folk Songs For Children, a book of musical notations and notated guides. The album's liner notes included a subject index for parents and teachers, complete lyric sheet, and recommended activities for each song. The album was re-released in 2000 by Smithsonian Folkways with an expanded track list.

Critical reception
Allmusic wrote that "Seeger renders them plainly and simply, singing and playing banjo, on a program designed especially (but not solely) for children between three and seven years of age." About Entertainment rated the album five stars and said, "This is a great album for family sing-alongs, for classroom use, and for children's entertainers who need a solid performance catalog." Record Roundup stated that, "Pete sings them all with great enthusiasm."

See also
Old American Songs
Carl Sandburg

References

External links
The Power of Pete Seeger's Songs and Stories School lesson plan
Pete Seeger for children Collection of 26 songs at YouTube.
Animated version of This Old Man 

1953 debut albums
Children's music albums by American artists
Pete Seeger albums
Folkways Records albums